The Screen Actors Guild Award for Outstanding Performance by a Cast (or Ensemble) in a Comedy Series is an award given by the Screen Actors Guild to honor the finest ensemble acting achievements in comedy series.

Winners and nominees

1990s

2000s

2010s

2020s

Multiple awards
2 awards
 Desperate Housewives (consecutive)
 The Marvelous Mrs. Maisel (consecutive)
 The Office (consecutive)
 Sex and the City

3 awards
 Orange Is the New Black (consecutive)
 Seinfeld (2 consecutive)

4 awards
 Modern Family (consecutive)

Multiple nominations
2 nominations
 Black-ish
 GLOW
 The Great
 Hacks
 The Marvelous Mrs. Maisel
 Only Murders in the Building
 Schitt's Creek
 Ted Lasso
 Ugly Betty
 Weeds

3 nominations
 3rd Rock from the Sun
 Arrested Development
 Barry
 Curb Your Enthusiasm
 Entourage
 The Kominsky Method

4 nominations
 Ally McBeal
 Glee
 Mad About You
 Orange Is the New Black
 Seinfeld

5 nominations
 Desperate Housewives
 Sex and the City
 Veep
 Will & Grace

6 nominations
 The Big Bang Theory

7 nominations
 30 Rock
 Everybody Loves Raymond
 Friends
 The Office

8 nominations
 Modern Family

10 nominations
 Frasier

See also
 Primetime Emmy Award for Outstanding Comedy Series
 Golden Globe Award for Best Television Series – Musical or Comedy
 Critics' Choice Television Award for Best Comedy Series

External links
 SAG Awards official site

Ensemble Comedy Series
 
Television awards for best cast